Buyruk may refer to:
Buyruks the sacred writings of the Alevi
Buyruk (Shabak) the sacred book of the Shabak

Turkish words and phrases